Günther Matzinger (born 16 May 1987) is an Austrian track and field athlete who competes in disability athletics in the T46 category. He won the gold medal for the 800 metres at the 2012 Paralympic Games for his category with a new World Record. Matzinger won a silver and bronze medal at the 2011 World Championships.

References

External links
 Paralympic.org IPC Profile
 Günther Matzinger official website

1987 births
Living people
Paralympic athletes of Austria
Paralympic gold medalists for Austria
Austrian male middle-distance runners
Austrian male triathletes
Paratriathletes of Austria
Athletes (track and field) at the 2012 Summer Paralympics
Medalists at the 2012 Summer Paralympics
European Games gold medalists for Austria
Athletes (track and field) at the 2015 European Games
European Games medalists in athletics
Paralympic medalists in athletics (track and field)
Paratriathletes at the 2020 Summer Paralympics
21st-century Austrian people